Poel is a German island in the Baltic Sea. 

Poel may also refer to:
 Gustav Poel (1917–2009), a German U-boat commander in World War II
 Jacobus Poel (1712–1775), a Dutch merchant in Russia and grand duke
 John Basil Poel (1881–1937), a District Chairman in the County of Essex, UK
 Piter Poel (1760–1837), a Russian diplomat and son of Jacobus Poel
 William Poel (1852–1934), an English actor, theatrical manager and dramatist

See also
 MV Poel, a Kriegsmarine coastal tanker
 Poels, a Dutch toponymic surname 
 Van der Poel, a Dutch toponymic surname